Haile Selassie was the emperor of Ethiopia from 1930 to 1974.

Haile Selassie may also refer to:

People 

 Imru Haile Selassie (1892-1980), Ethiopian noble, military commander and diplomat.
 Haile Selassie Gugsa (1907–1985), Ethiopian military commander, fascist collaborator, and noble.
 Prince Makonnen (1924-1957), Makonnen Haile Selassie, Ethiopian noble and son of Haile Selassie I.
 Princess Romanework (died 1940), Romanework Haile Selassie, daughter of Haile Selassie I.
 Yohannes Haile-Selassie (born 1961) Ethiopian paleoanthropologist.
 Haile Gebrselassie (born 1973) Ethiopian Businessman and former long-distance runner.
 Maren Haile-Selassie (born 1999), Swiss footballer

Places 

 Addis Ababa Bole International Airport, formerly Haile Selassie I International Airport.
 Addis Ababa University, formerly Haile Selassie I University.

Art 

 Bust of Haile Selassie, destroyed in 2020.